General elections were held in San Marino on 11 November 2012. The 60 seats in the Grand and General Council were up for grabs. The elections were held using the majority bonus system. The previous election, held in 2008, provided the Sammarinese Christian Democratic Party with the largest single parliamentary group. The Party of Socialists and Democrats, although winning more votes than the former, became the main opposition party.

However, for the 2012 elections, the two parties decided to run together, under the banner of the coalition San Marino Common Good. They were joined by the Popular Alliance. Meanwhile, the remaining major parties formed the coalitions Agreement for the Country and Active Citizenship, politically placed in the center and on the left, respectively.

Coalitions and parties
The incumbent Sammarinese Christian Democratic Party (PDCS) is leading a coalition called San Marino Common Good. It was contested by another coalition under the banner Agreement for the Country and a third coalition is called Active Citizenship. Apart from the coalitions, there are also three more parties running on their own: For San Marino, the RETE Movement and San Marino 3.0.

There were 356 candidates for the 60 seats.

Voting centres were open from 7:00 to 20:00.

Results

Twenty MPs were new to the council, and 10 MPs were women. Additionally, 1,356 of the voting cards had obscene drawings on them, a total of 6.41%, and a high number of void ballots led to accusations of a scandal.

References

General elections in San Marino
San Marino
General election
[[Category:November 2012 events in Europe|San Marino]